Edmar Figueira (born 13 May 1984, in Naviraí) is a Brazilian professional footballer who last played for SC São Paulo. He is a left-footed striker.

Career
Figueira made his first football steps as a youth in Brazilian clubs Paraná Soccer Technical Center (PSTC), União Bandeirantes and Paranavai Atletico Club. He became a professional footballer by playing in Sociedade Esportiva Matsubara and quickly his good potential and performances there give him his first chance in Europe, in the Swiss club Grasshopper Club Zurich in 2003 at the age of 18. He also passed a short period in Germany under negotiation with the Bundesliga Club SC Freiburg, but did not sign because of not having an EU passport.

Figueira decided to return to Brazil to play again for Sociedade Esportiva Matsubara, and won the BTV laser cup 2004 in Vietnam with them.

His next signing after that must be noticed as he had the chance to play for club America Football Club from Rio de Janeiro. His next attempt away from Brazil after being more experienced, was in 2007 when he went to Armenia to play in the UEFA Europa League qualifiers with FC Banants. In the next season 2008–09, he was transferred to Primera Division de Costa Rica to play for C.S. Cartaginés.

After a good season with C.S. Cartaginés in the Primera Division de Costa Rica, Figueira got a good offer from India and signed for the I-League newboys Pune FC for the 2009–10 season, where he made history helping Pune FC finish third in his debut. With 15 goals in his first I-League season for Pune FC, Figueira was awarded "Player of the Year" winning the "Golden Ball 2010" and two more prizes: "Golden Goal" for the best goal scored in the league and the "Player's Player of the Year" award as well.

Figueira renewed his contract with Pune Football Club on 31 May 2011, for the season 2010–2011.

Figueira is a talented left-foot striker center-forward. His main characteristics in field are that he is strong, quick, has an impressive technique, perfect finishing, is a very good header, has good physical preparation and excellent vision of the game.

After scoring 28 goals in 40 matches, Figueira was the only player in the history of the I-League to be transferred to a Europe top division club, CD Feirense. Without to playing an official match, he canceled his contract and signed to Liga I Romanian first Division Ceahlaul Piatra Neamt for the 2011–12 season.

After a season in Romenia Liga I with some injury problems, Figueira went to Germany and signed with FC Oberneuland from Bremen to play the DFB-Pokal and Regionalliga Nord the season 2012–13 season.

After half season with the German team, he transferred to Al-Shorta SC (Damascus) from Syria to play in the Asia AFC Cup 2013.

He signed for Rangdajied United F.C. for the 2013–14 season to start his second spell in India.

After long time playing outside He sign for Sport Club São Paulo from Rio Grande-RS Brazil to play the first division of the Brazilian championship Gauchão 2015.

Honours

 BTV Lazer Cup 2004
 Player of the Year: 2010
 Golden Goal: 2010
 Quarter Finals AFC Cup - Al-Shorta FC - Syria

References

External links
 "Golden Ball 2010"
 
 Award Nomination
 "Transfer to Portugal Primeira Liga by Goal.com"
 "Transfer to Romenia LIGA I"
 Watch Edmar Figuera in action.
 Interviewed after game in Costa Rica
 "Transfer to Romania LIGA I"
 
 Transfer to Portugal Primeira Liga by Goal.com
 "Bola de Ouro na India" Brazil site
 Edmar Figueira at playmakerstats.com (English version of ogol.com.br)
 
 "Player of the Year" Golden Ball 2010.
 Award Nomination by FPAI

Brazilian footballers
Brazilian expatriate footballers
1984 births
Living people
Expatriate footballers in India
Expatriate footballers in Syria
Sportspeople from Mato Grosso do Sul
Brazilian expatriate sportspeople in India
Pune FC players
Rangdajied United F.C. players
I-League players
CSM Ceahlăul Piatra Neamț players
Association football forwards
Syrian Premier League players